EML or eml may refer to:

Computing 
 .eml, a file extension
 Ecological Metadata Language
 Election Markup Language
 Emotion Markup Language

Other uses 
 East Malling railway station, in England
 East Manchester Line, a tram line of the Manchester Metrolink
 Eating Media Lunch, a satirical New Zealand news show
 Eicher Motors, an Indian automobile engine manufacturer
 Electronic Music Laboratories, an American audio synthesizer manufacturer
 EML Sidecars, a Dutch sidecarcross and quad manufacturer
 Environmental Measurements Laboratory of United States Department of Homeland Security
 Euro Marine Logistics, a Belgian shipping company
 Militärflugplatz Emmen, a Swiss military airfield
 Estonian Navy Ship, a ship prefix
 WHO Essential Medicines List
 eml, a deprecated ISO 639-3 code for the Emilian-Romagnol language
  Earth-Moon-Libration points are points of equilibrium for small-mass objects in the Earth-Moon system